Ambraüsus "Brausch" Niemann (born 7 January 1939 in Durban) is a former racing driver from South Africa. He participated in 2 Formula One World Championship Grands Prix in 1963 and 1965, both in his home country, driving a privately entered Lotus.  He managed to qualify for the first of these, finishing 14th and scoring no championship points.

After success in Formula Junior in the mid-1960s, Niemann switched to enduro motor cycle racing, winning the South African championship in 1979.

Racing record

Complete Formula One World Championship results
(key)

Complete British Saloon Car Championship results
(key) (Races in bold indicate pole position; races in italics indicate fastest lap.)

† Events with 2 races staged for the different classes.

References
"The Grand Prix Who's Who", Steve Small, 1996

South African racing drivers
South African Formula One drivers
1939 births
Living people
Sportspeople from Durban